Blue woodruff is a common name for several plants and may refer to:

Asperula arvensis
Asperula orientalis